Shao Puliang (Chinese: 邵镤亮; Pinyin: Shào Púliàng; born 6 July 1989) is a Chinese professional football player who currently plays as a goalkeeper for Shijiazhuang Ever Bright.

Club career
Shao Puliang was promoted to Chinese Super League side Shandong Luneng's first squad in the 2008 season. After several seasons at the club, he did not make an appearance for Shandong until the 2015 league season when on 13 May 2015 in a 2015 Chinese FA Cup against amateur team Wuhan New Era with a 6–1 win.

Shao transferred to fellow Super League club Shijiazhuang Ever Bright on 8 January 2016. He made his debut for Shijiazhuang on 11 May 2016, in a 2016 Chinese FA Cup against Beijing Renhe. On 30 October 2016, Shao made his Super League debut in a 3–2 home victory against Guangzhou R&F.

Career statistics 
.

References

External links
 

1989 births
Living people
Chinese footballers
Association football goalkeepers
Footballers from Qingdao
Shandong Taishan F.C. players
Cangzhou Mighty Lions F.C. players
Chinese Super League players
China League One players